Sinfield is a surname. Notable people with the surname include:

 Alan Sinfield (1941–2017), British academic
 Ian Sinfield (athlete) (1934–2010), Australian runner
 Ian Sinfield, Scottish rugby player
 Kevin Sinfield (born 1980), English rugby player
 Peter Sinfield (born 1943), English songwriter
 Reg Sinfield (1900–1988), English cricketer

See also